Stalev is a Slavic masculine surname, its feminine counterpart is Staleva. It may refer to

 Hristo Stalev (born 1985), Bulgarian football player
 Slavi Stalev (born 1994), Bulgarian footballer
 Stoyan Stalev (born 1952), Bulgarian politician; Minister of Foreign Affairs of Bulgaria (1997)

Slavic-language surnames